Saint Emma or Hemma may refer to: 

 Saint Hemma of Gurk, c. 980–1045, Austria
 Saint Emma of Lesum or Emma of Stiepel, also known as Hemma and Imma, d. 1038, Bremen, Germany

 Hemma (808–876), queen of Louis the German, is sometimes called Saint Emma

See also
 Emma (disambiguation)